The Province of Schleswig-Holstein was a province of the Kingdom of Prussia from 1868 to 1946; in 1918 it was renamed the Free State of Prussia.

History
It was created from the Duchies of Schleswig and Holstein, which had been conquered by Prussia and the Austrian Empire from Denmark in the Second War of Schleswig in 1864. Following the Austro-Prussian War in 1866, which ended in Austrian defeat, Schleswig and Holstein were annexed by decree of the King of Prussia on 12 January 1867. The province was created in 1868, and it incorporated the Duchy of Lauenburg from 1876 onward.

Following the defeat of Imperial Germany in World War I, the Allied powers organised two plebiscites in Northern and Central Schleswig on 10 February and 14 March 1920, respectively. In Northern Schleswig, 75% voted for reunification with Denmark and 25% for staying with Germany. In Central Schleswig, the situation was reversed, with 80% voting for Germany and 20% for Denmark. No vote ever took place in the southern third of Schleswig, as it was considered a foregone conclusion that almost all the inhabitants would vote to remain in Germany.

On 15 June 1920, Northern Schleswig was officially reunited with Denmark (see: South Jutland County). The remainder of Schleswig remained part of Schleswig-Holstein, now a province of the Free State of Prussia.

With the Greater Hamburg Act of 1937, the Hanseatic City of Lübeck and the Oldenburgian exclave Region of Lübeck were incorporated into the Schleswig-Holstein province, while a number of Hamburg's adjacent municipalities, among them the city districts of Altona and Wandsbek, were incorporated into the Hanseatic City of Hamburg. This again ceded its exclaves of Geesthacht and Großhansdorf to Schleswig-Holstein.

After World War II, Schleswig-Holstein was part of the British occupation zone, although some municipalities of Schleswig-Holstein east of Ratzeburg were exchanged for municipalities of Mecklenburg in the Soviet occupation zone (Barber Lyashchenko Agreement). The British-occupied section became the new German state of Schleswig-Holstein on 23 August 1946, which joined the Federal Republic of Germany on 23 May 1949.

See also
Schleswig-Holstein
Schleswig-Holstein Question
History of Schleswig-Holstein
Peace of Prague (1866)
Schleswig Plebiscites
Persecution of the Jews in Schleswig-Holstein (1933–1945)

References

External links

Gemeindeverzeichnis Deutschland 1900 
Deutsche-Schutzgebiete.de 

Schleswig-Holstein, Province of
 Schleswig-Holstein
1868 establishments in Prussia
1946 disestablishments in Germany